Martin Klempa (born July 20, 1973) is a Slovak former professional ice hockey goaltender. He played in the Slovak Extraliga with HK SKP Poprad, HC Košice and MHK Kežmarok and also played in the Russian Superleague with Molot-Prikamye Perm and in the British Elite Ice Hockey League for the Belfast Giants and the Coventry Blaze.

External links

1973 births
Living people
Belfast Giants players
Coventry Blaze players
HK Poprad players
HC Košice players
MHK Kežmarok players
Molot-Prikamye Perm players
Sportspeople from Poprad
Slovak ice hockey goaltenders
Slovak expatriate sportspeople in Northern Ireland
Slovak expatriate ice hockey people
Expatriate ice hockey players in Northern Ireland
Slovak expatriate sportspeople in England
Slovak expatriate ice hockey players in Russia
Expatriate ice hockey players in England